Mia moglie è una strega is a 1980 Italian comedy film directed by Castellano & Pipolo.

Plot 
The spirit of Finnicella, a witch burned at the stake, is liberated. She immediately goes on the trail of a descendant of the cardinal who ordered her death, Emilio, a stock broker. Nevertheless, her plans for revenge will collide with love.

Cast 
Renato Pozzetto as Emilio Altieri/Cardinal Altieri
Eleonora Giorgi as Finnicella
Lia Tanzi as Tania Grisanti
Helmut Berger as Asmodeo

Production
Mia moglie è una strega began shooting on May 19, 1980. Often described as a remake of I Married a Witch by René Clair, Castellano & Pipolo denied that the film was a remake, stating that the film was not a "remake, a retelling, or a rip-off" stating the film was more of an attempt at an American fantastique type film comparing it to Mary Poppins or The Love Bug. According to the directors, the film was made for about 800 million Italian lire.

Release
Mia moglie è una strega was distributed theatrically in Italy by Cineriz on 1 December 1980. The film grossed a total 1,835,662,000 Italian lire domestically.  It was among the highest-grossing films of the year in Italy, being the seventh highest-grossing film of the year.

References

Footnotes

Sources

External links

1980 films
Italian fantasy comedy films
Films directed by Castellano & Pipolo
Films scored by Detto Mariano
1980s fantasy comedy films
Films about witchcraft
1980 comedy films
1980s Italian films